The Girl in the Yellow Jumper is a Ugandan mystery-thriller produced and directed by Loukman Ali. It was announced that the film would premiere in Kampala on 18 April 2020. It follows a man who escapes a hostage situation only to find himself in deeper trouble. It stars Rehema Nanfuka, Philip Luswata, Michael Wawuyo Jr., Michael Wawuyo, Oyenbot and Maurice Kirya.

Plot Summary 
A man is watching a television report on the "Cigarette Butt serial Killer" when he is taken hostage by a mysterious figure wearing a yellow jumper.

Later, he is found by a highway, disheveled and wearing a yellow jumper, and is rescued by an off-duty cop, who is driving an elderly crime witness (who is implied to be connected with the Cigarette Butt Serial Killer case) to a police station back in the city. The man tells his story: he was captured and tortured by two female religious extremists for a political cartoon, but managed to escape after stealing their shotgun and killing one of his captors.

The cop does not fully believe in the story, but offers to drive the man to the police station, as he's already headed in that direction. The cop receives a call with concerning news about his girlfriend and decides to stop home, where he'll meet his girlfriend's sister, before heading to the police station.

The man gets off the car and heads to the bathroom, and recognizes the cop's girlfriend's sister as the survived kidnapper. He panics and tries to leave, but the kidnapper has also recognized him and tells the cop, saying the man has killed his girlfriend. The cop enters the bathroom and pulls out his pistol to torture the man by "kneecapping".

The man is next seen handcuffed beside the elderly witness on the backseat of the police officer's car, who is still driving towards the police station. The passenger's seat is now occupied by the kidnapper, who is telling a different version of the events: the man is a sexual predator who has impregnated a 12-year-old girl, who later died when he tried to abort her himself. The cop's girlfriend, who was a nurse at hospital where the girl died, sought out revenge with her sister's help.

The man struggles to grab the kidnapper's shotgun that he still has on his bag, but he draws the cop's attention. There's a shootout and the only survivor is the elderly witness. He stumbles out of the vehicle, flags down a passing car and kills the driver using the cop's pistol. He escapes the scene in the stolen car, leaving a cigarette butt on the ground first.

Cast

Production

Pre-production 
Loukman Ali wrote the script earlier, since he's also a sketch artist he storyboarded all the shots at this stage. Props testing were also done since a couple of Instagram posts show an unidentified model in a gas mask, which later turned out to be in the film.

Filming 
Principal Photography began in 2018 in Northern part of Uganda, and despite all the challenges that came along the shooting, Loukman and his cinematographer Naizi Nasser managed to wrap up the in the year in August 2018.

On 21 January 2019, Loukman uploaded a first look captioned as a test footage from the girl in the yellow jumper which received a bunch of positive reviews from all around the world.

The film was shot on Red Cameras. and different gear was used as seen in different behind the scene pictures, car mounts for moving car scenes, as well as cranes and gimbals.

Since this was Loukman's first feature film, filming was at sometimes put on hold due to running out of fund as he's quoted in an interview with Kampala's THE SUN

“We had every single problem that you can have on a film set,” Ali says. “Shooting in Uganda is not easy, every single location we go to, they chase us away.” and also Loukman Ali: There were times the actors went without food because we had used up all the money. We stopped filming for more than a year as we scraped together resources. The actors would return after months having changed, having gained weight, grown hair or a beard where there was only stubble in the previous scene.

Post Production 
The film was edited by Loukman Ali, who blended Computer Generated Imagery (CGI) created with cinema4d into his shots.

The first teaser trailer released on Apr 18, 2020 which was a viral hit due to its perceived high quality,

Music 
Artists at Quad A, an African audio production company, worked on the sound design and film scoring headed by Andrew Ahuurra, who had previously worked on various films, including Disneys Queen of Katwe. A number of already existing Ugandan songs like Bobiwine's Bada were added alongside others originally composed for the film.

Sound department of The Girl in The Yellow Jumper

Release

COVID-19 pandemic and hacking
The COVID-19 pandemic reached Uganda in March 2020 and affected the premiere of the film as the country was put on lockdown. There were plans for the film to premiere on paid streaming sites, but the production company's online accounts were hacked and the film was leaked on their very YouTube channel for free streaming just days before its premiere date.

It would later be discovered that Loukman Ali had uploaded a combination of trailers making up to 1 hour and 22 minutes labelled as "THE GIRL IN THE YELLOW JUMPER leaked full movie" as a prank to increase hype around the movie.

Initial release fail 
The film was initially to be released locally in Ugandan theaters on 20 April 2020, but the COVID-19 Pandemic forced theaters to close down. A disappointed Loukman Ali did loose his positivity in filmmaking. Later on he made a YouTube short film The blind Date followed by its prequel Sixteen rounds.

Netflix Release 
On Friday 13th, Loukman announced that his had become the first local film to be picked up by Netflix. It was made available for streaming the following Friday. Loukman stated that after the film's release getting interrupted by the outbreak, he handed it to distributors who sold the movie streaming rights to Netflix.

Accolades

References

External links
 
 Trailer
The Girl in The Yellow Jumper Review: Uganda’s First Movie To be at Netflix is Good But it wouldve been better Review
The Girl in the Yellow Jumper Reviewed by Alvin Alexa
 Cinema Ug
https://kampalasun.co.ug/loukman-alis-the-girl-in-the-yellow-jumper-first-ugandan-film-on-netflix-what-can-ugandan-filmmakers-learn/
https://www.instagram.com/p/CWKRk9xB6Aa/

Films set in Uganda
Films shot in Uganda
English-language Ugandan films
2020 films
2020 thriller films
2020s English-language films